A mound is an artificial heap or pile, especially of earth, rocks, or sand.

Mound and Mounds may also refer to:

Places
 Mound, Louisiana, United States
 Mound, Minnesota, United States
 Mound, Texas, United States
 Mound, West Virginia
 Mound Creek, a stream in Minnesota
 Mounds, Illinois, United States
 Mounds, Oklahoma, United States
 The Mound, a street in Edinburgh, Scotland, linking the Old Town and the New Town
 The Mound railway station, a former station in northern Scotland

Arts, entertainment, and media
 Mound, a fictional entity in the work of artist Trenton Doyle Hancock
 The Mound (novella), a 1940 work by H. P. Lovecraft

Other uses
 Mound, monumental earthwork mound built by prehistoric Mound builder (people)
 Mound Laboratories, a nuclear laboratory in Miamisburg, Ohio that was a part of the Manhattan Project
 Mounds (candy), a candy bar
 Pitchers mound, a raised surface on a baseball diamond from which pitches are thrown

See also
 Mound builder (disambiguation)